Spusti me na zemlju is the fourth, studio album from Serbian rock band Negative. The album was released on April 24, 2009 after a five-year hiatus, and it has a bit more powerful and heavier sound than the previous album. In the beginning of May, it was announced that the first single from the album will be "Daj mi ritam", and the video premiered on MTV Adria.

Track listing

External links
 Negative Official Page (Serbian and English)
 On: www.discogs.com
 Album Info and Free Download

2009 albums
Negative (Serbian band) albums
City Records albums